Jan Smit (born 27 February 1983) is a Dutch former professional footballer who played as a forward for Volendam.

References

1983 births
Living people
People from Purmerend
Dutch footballers
Association football forwards
FC Volendam players
Eerste Divisie players
Eredivisie players
Footballers from North Holland